Aaliyah Nolan (born 12 June 1997) is a Bermudian footballer who plays as a forward and a midfielder for English FA Women's National League club Leeds United WFC and the Bermuda women's national team.

Early life
Nolan was raised in Warwick. She also lived in St. George's. She was 11 when she was introduced to football by her father and brother. At 12, she participated at the 2009 Central American and Caribbean Age Group Championships in Athletics.

College career
Nolan attended the Navarro College and the University of North Texas in the United States. She scored 23 goals for the former in 2016.

Club career
On 27 November 2018, Nolan joined PHC Zebras in Bermuda. On 10 September 2020, it was known she had moved to England to play for Leeds United. Her signing was officially announced by the English club on 18 September. She made her FA Women's Premier League Division One debut two days later in a 1–2 away loss to Norton & Stockton Ancients. She has played for Leeds United since then.

International career
Nolan represented Bermuda at the 2013 CONCACAF Women's U-17 Championship qualification and the 2015 CONCACAF Women's U-20 Championship qualification. She capped at senior level during the 2013 Island Games, the 2014 CFU Women's Caribbean Cup and the 2022 CONCACAF W Championship qualification.

Career statistics

International goals

Honours

International
Bermuda
 Island Games: 2013

See also
List of Bermuda women's international footballers

References

Match reports

External links

1997 births
Living people
People from Warwick Parish
Bermudian women's footballers
Women's association football forwards
Women's association football midfielders
Navarro Bulldogs soccer players
North Texas Mean Green women's soccer players
PHC Zebras players
Leeds United F.C. players
FA Women's National League players
Bermuda women's international footballers
Bermudian expatriate footballers
Bermudian expatriate sportspeople in the United States
Expatriate women's soccer players in the United States
Bermudian expatriate sportspeople in England
Expatriate women's footballers in England
Bermudian female athletes